Teddy Osei (born December 1937) is a musician and saxophone player from Ghana. Osei is best known as the leader of the Afro-pop band Osibisa, founded in 1969. Born in Kumasi, Osei was introduced to musical instruments while still a child. He began to play the saxophone while attempting to create a band with his college friends in the coastal city of Sekondi. After graduating from college, he worked as a building inspector for a year before creating a band called "The Comets." The Comets enjoyed brief popularity before Osei traveled to London in 1962. He received a grant from the Ghanaian government to study at a private music and drama school for three years, before being forced to leave by a regime change in Ghana. In 1969, he founded Osibisa along with several other musicians. The band remained popular through the 1970s, before experiencing a decline, although it continues to perform today.

Personal life
Osei was born in Kumasi, the capital of the Ashanti region of Ghana. At birth, he was christened "Francis" by his parents, who were Roman Catholics. He was the second of seven children in the family. His date of birth is unknown due to the absence of record keeping in Ghana at the time; his mother later estimated that he was born in December 1937. In keeping with his family's tradition, each child was given a different last name. Teddy Osei was named after the Ashanti king Osei Tutu. Osei's father was an amateur musician who played the horn in the local church band, thus exposing Osei to music while he was still young. He was introduced to traditional musical instruments by his school teacher, and played the bass drum in the school band. He also frequented the Ashanti palace, where he occasionally learned folk songs from visiting musicians. After completing pre-school, Osei was enrolled at a Catholic mission school, where he experienced harsh discipline. He later stated that he had been more afraid of the teachers there than any others in his life. He became a popular athlete at the school, as well as an altar boy.

Following his graduation, Osei worked as an office boy for a year, before moving to Sekondi to study draftsmanship at a college. Sekondi was an important commercial and cultural hub, and he encountered a number of modern musicians and genres there. During this time he was influenced by Kwame Nkrumah, and supported his political party and its campaign against British colonialism. After completing his degree, Osei returned to Kumasi and worked as a building inspector for a brief while, before choosing to become a professional musician. Teddy has two daughters Matilda and Shanta Osei.

Early musical career
While at college, he attempted to put together a band along with some of his friends. According to Osei, he only began to play the saxophone because the person who had volunteered for that instrument did not attend the practices. He continued to teach himself the saxophone, listening to records of jazz musicians and playing along with the music. After beginning work as an inspector, he created a semi-professional band along with his brother and some friends. The band was known as the "Comets," and became successful in Ghana, recording with Philips West Africa and playing for a radio show. Their music was inspired by "Highlife," a genre derived from a fusion of European and African influences.

In 1962 Osei travelled to London, leaving the Comets behind. Having spent his money on travel, he lived with some friends in London, and worked as a dish-washer for a year. He then applied for and received a grant from the Ghanaian government, which allowed him to attend a private music and drama school for three years. However, his grant was terminated after Nkrumah was deposed in 1966. Osei teamed up with several other students who had also lost their positions and began to play soul music at various venues across Europe. The group acquired a following in Switzerland, and named themselves "Cat's Paw". At this stage its members included Sol Amarfio and Osei's brother MacTontoh, both future members of Osibisa. However, the group eventually returned to the UK, looking for a more permanent financial situation.

Osibisa

In 1969, Osei, Amarfio, and MacTontoh came together with other musicians that they had been previously acquainted with to form Osibisa. The new band derived its name from osibisaaba, the name given to the style of music that was a fusion of "palm-wine" music and traditional Fante fisherman's traditional music. In its early stages Osibisa had neither an agent nor a manager. The band played at psychedelic venues around London while it tried to find financial support. During this period Osei played flute and African drums as well as saxophone.

The band became an instant success, producing several songs that reached the British top-ten. They were even more popular when playing live. During the late 1970s they played on several international tours to India, Japan, Australia, New Zealand and several African countries. In 1980 the band played at a concert celebrating the independence of Zimbabwe. However, by the early 1980s, it had begun to lose popularity, and also had differences with its recording agents. Several members left the band, although Osei continued to perform. Despite their decline in popularity, Osibisa continue to perform today.

References

1937 births
Living people
20th-century Ghanaian male singers
21st-century Ghanaian male singers
Ghanaian highlife musicians
Ghanaian Roman Catholics
People from Kumasi